Cubo Architects is a Danish architectural practice located in Aarhus. The company was founded in 1992.

Selected projects 
 1996 Transportcenter, Hørning
 1998 Faculty for Health Sciences, University of Southern Denmark, Odense
 2000 Jysk store, Brabrand, Aarhus
 2002 Hanstholm fortress Museum
 2003 Egaa Gymnasium, Aarhus

Projects 
 Bergen University College, Bergen, Norway 
 Business Academy Aarhus
 Technical University of Denmark
 University of Southern Denmark, Odense
 Aarhus University Hospital, Aarhus, in collaboration with C. F. Møller Architects

References

External links  

 

Architecture firms of Denmark
Companies based in Aarhus
Danish companies established in 1992
Design companies established in 1992